Ghisha Koenig (8 December 1921 - 15 October 1993) was a British sculptor whose work focused on the work place, especially factories as a hub of human activity.

Life 
Ghisha Koenig was born in London on 8 December 1921, the daughter of Leo Koenig (1898-1970), art critic and writer, and his wife, Fanny Hildebrand (fl. 1900-1940), formerly a Yiddish actress. In 1950, she married Dr. Emanuel (Manny) Tuckman, and they had one daughter, Sarah. She died on 15 October 1993.

Work 
Koenig studied at the Hornsey School of Art, the Chelsea School of Art with Henry Moore, and the Slade School of Art. During World War II she was a member of the Auxiliary Territorial Service. 

Between 1955 and 1956 she spent time observing and sketching people at work at an ink factory in Kent. The resulting sculpture was created in clay and made in cast concrete. It was called "The Machine Minders" and is at Tate Liverpool.

Her first solo exhibition was at the Grosvenor Gallery in London in 1966. She also had a solo exhibition at the Serpentine Gallery in London in 1986. This exhibition included works created from 1968 to 1986 from three series, The Glassworks, The Tentmakers and The Plate and Coil Shop. Factories she visited or worked at included J & E Hall, Dartford (APV Products Ltd) which made escalators and salination systems, the Plate and Coil Shop, and the Fettling Shop. Many of her sculptures are done in bronze or terracotta bas-reliefs.

Her work is in the permanent collection of the Tate Gallery, the Museum of Labour History in Manchester, Middleheim Museum in Belgium, the Graves Art Gallery in Sheffield, the City Art Gallery in Stoke-on Trent, Homerton College in Cambridge, and the City Art Gallery in Manchester. Public commissions include the Ministry of Work, 1950; Festival of Britain, 1951; St. John the Divine, 1961; Dalton House School, Sevenoaks, Kent 1986.

Exhibitions 
 1953, 1958, 1960, 1963 The Royal Academy
 1958-61 Society of Portrait Sculptors
 1959 Smithsonian Institution, Washington
 1963, 1964, 1966, 1968, Grosvenor Gallery, London
 1974 Ghisha Koenig Sculpture 1968-74, Bedford House Gallery, London
 1978 Wins Arts Council Award solo show at Galerie Husstege, Holland
 1986, retrospective solo exhibition at the Serpentine Gallery
 1986, 1994, 2005, 2010 Boundary Gallery, London;
 1993 Tate Gallery, London
 2017 Ghisha Koenig: Machines Restrict Their Movement, Henry Moore Institute, Leeds

References

External links
 

1921 births
1993 deaths
20th-century English women artists
Alumni of Chelsea College of Arts
Alumni of Middlesex University
Alumni of the Slade School of Fine Art
Auxiliary Territorial Service soldiers
English women sculptors
Jewish women sculptors
Modern sculptors
Sculptors from London